Uzhur is a town and the administrative center of Uzhursky District in Krasnoyarsk Krai, Russia, located approximately  from Krasnoyarsk between Kuznetsk Alatau and Solgon mountain ranges where the Chernavka River flows into the Uzhurka. Population:

History
It was founded in 1760 as the seat of Uzhurskaya Volost. First it was a small village, but it grew and in 1953 it was granted town status.

Administrative and municipal status
Within the framework of administrative divisions, Uzhur serves as the administrative center of Uzhursky District. As an administrative division, it is incorporated within Uzhursky District as the district town of Uzhur. As a municipal division, the district town of Uzhur is incorporated within Uzhursky Municipal District as Uzhur Urban Settlement.

Economy
The economy of the town is based on well-developed agriculture and the railway line. The most developed agricultural aspects are crops growing, dairy and milk production, and cattle and sheep breeding. There are about fifty different businesses in Uzhur. 90% of all production is food industry. Some part of it is exported all over Krasnoyarsk Krai.

Military
Uzhur is home to the 62nd Missile Division of the Strategic Rocket Forces of Russia and houses a base containing several R-36M ICBMs.

Notable people
Tamara Samsonova (born 1947), suspected serial killer
Viktor Vladislavovich Zubarev (born 1973), politician

References

Notes

Sources

Cities and towns in Krasnoyarsk Krai
Yeniseysk Governorate